Floris is a census-designated place (CDP) located within the Oak Hill area of Fairfax County, Virginia, United States. The population as of the 2010 census was 8,375.

Geography
Floris is located in northwestern Fairfax County, south of Herndon, around the intersection of Centreville and West Ox roads. It is bordered by McNair to the north, Reston to the northeast, Franklin Farm to the south, and by Virginia State Route 28 to the west, separating the community from Washington Dulles International Airport.

Education
Floris is within Fairfax County Public Schools. Rachel Carson Middle School is in Floris.

Private schools:
King Abdullah Academy
Nysmith School (PK-8)

References

External links
Virginia Trend Report 2: State and Complete Places (Sub-state 2010 Census Data)

Unincorporated communities in Virginia
Census-designated places in Fairfax County, Virginia
Washington metropolitan area
Census-designated places in Virginia